Xylotrechus durangoensis is a species of beetle in the family Cerambycidae. It was described by Chemsak and Linsley in 1974.

References

Xylotrechus
Beetles described in 1974